Aleksandr Borisovich Shestakov (born 22 November 1961) is a Soviet wrestler. He competed in the men's Greco-Roman 57 kg at the 1988 Summer Olympics.

References

1961 births
Living people
Soviet male sport wrestlers
Olympic wrestlers of the Soviet Union
Wrestlers at the 1988 Summer Olympics
Sportspeople from Minsk
European Wrestling Championships medalists